Seven ships of the Royal Navy have been named HMS Orpheus. Orpheus was the magical father of songs in Greek mythology.

  was a modified Lowestoffe-class frigate launched in 1773. She was burnt in 1778 to avoid capture by the French at Rhode Island.
  was a 32-gun fifth rate launched in 1780. In 1807 she was wrecked in the West Indies.
  was a 36-gun fifth rate launched in 1809. She was broken up in 1819.
  was a 22-gun  wooden screw corvette launched in 1860. She was wrecked on the Manukau sandbars in New Zealand in 1863.
  was an  launched in 1916. She was sold for scrap in 1921.
  was an  launched in 1929.
She was paid off in 1987 and became a harbour training ship. She was sold for scrap in 1994.

References

Royal Navy ship names